Grab or Grabs may refer to:

Places

Bosnia and Herzegovina 
 Grab, Ljubuški
 Grab, Trebinje
 Grab, Trnovo

Croatia 
 Grab, Split-Dalmatia County, a settlement in Trilj
 Grab, Zadar County

Kosovo
 Grab (peak)

Montenegro 
 Grab, Bijelo Polje

Poland 
 Grab, Kalisz County, Greater Poland Voivodeship
 Grab, Pleszew County, Greater Poland Voivodeship
 Grab, Subcarpathian Voivodeship, Poland

Serbia 
 Grab, Lučani

Switzerland 
 Grabs, Switzerland, a municipality in the canton of St. Gallen

United States 
 Grab, Kentucky

People
 Grab (surname), a list of people
 Detlev Grabs (born 1960), East German retired swimmer

Technology 
 Grab (software), a screenshot application
 Grab (tool), a mechanical device
 Galactic Radiation and Background, or GRAB, a series of electronic signals intelligence satellites operated by the U.S. Naval Research Laboratory

Other uses 
 Grab (company), a Singaporean multinational ridesharing company
 Grab (ship), a two- or three-masted vessel used on the Malabar Coast
 Grabs (skateboarding)

See also 

 
 
 
 Grasp (disambiguation)
 Snatch (disambiguation)